Shining Spark (January 18, 1989 – December 27, 2021) was an award-winning and hall of fame reining Quarter horse. Shining Spark is in the National Reining Horse Association Hall of Fame (NHRA) Hall of Fame. He is a 2013 NHRA Four Million Dollar Sire. He is also a National Reined Cow Horse Association (NRHCA) Four Million Dollar Sire. He sired 1,316 foals after his quarter horse career.

Early life 
Shining Spark was born on January 18, 1989. He was bred by Carol Rose, who owned him his entire life. He was a Palomino Quarter Horse. He was sired by Genuine Doc and out of American Quarter Horse Hall of Fame (AQHA) mare Diamonds Sparkle. He became the anchor of Carol Rose's breeding program.

His sire, Genuine Doc, was the Senior Cutting Reserve World Champion. His dam, Diamond Sparkles, is the 1979 AQHA Superhorse. His dam is also a member of the NRHA Hall of Fame. His sire Genuine Doc was bred, raised, and trained by those whom Rose picked as only the best. Genuine Doc is a leading sire of reining and cutting horses. Doc is an AQHA Superhorse sire. Doc has progeny bearing numerous AQHA and NHRA world champions.

Career 
By 1990, Rose was an experienced breeder and showman. She had learned by showing horses such as Gay Bars Gen, Zan Parr Bar, and Genuine Doc.Through these horses, she had earned world championships in the National Cutting Horse Association (NCHA) and AQHA venues. She was on a journey to become the No. 1 breeder. Rose already knew what it took to make a good performance horse. She wanted a horse with all the traits, including being a pretty horse but with athletic conformation, and a good mind.

When Shining Spark was a long yearling, Rose had her trainer, Jeff Petska, start him. It didn't take long for him to call Rose over to the pen to see how quickly he stopped at such a young age. He had a lot of stop in him too. Rose originally planned to make him a cutting horse. Bobby Lewis, also her trainer, suggested he might excel in reining events. They sent him to acclaimed horse trainer Bob Lewis. Lewis took sixth place at the 1992 NRH Futurity, from among 408 entries. Shining Spark was an open reserve champion at the Lazy E Classic the next year. Following those events, Rose wanted to show the stallion herself. She inquired of Tim and Colleen McQuay if they would assist her with him.

Trainer Tim McQuay led Shining Spark to win the 1993 AQHA junior reining world champion with a score of 227.5. He beat out another horse who scored 225. It was an important win for Rose. Then, in 1994, they won the National Reining Horse Association Derby. He was marked a score of 230.5. to win his NRHA Derby title. He earned $16,000 in his showing career, a significant amount in that time period.

Shining Spark reached leading sire status for the first time in 2003. He kept that status until September 2021. He was the first sire to reach Three Million Sire Status in the NRCHA. He is the Number One Maternal Grandsire of Cow Horse Money Earners per Equi-Stat records.

Progeny
Shining Spark's progeny eclipse both reining and reined cow competition. They also overshadow the competition in roping events. In 2005, his progeny won four World Championships. He has sired more than 1,300 (1,316) foals. He has earned more than ten million dollars. In 2002, he was the youngest stallon to secure the NRHA million dollar sire title. He is the first all-time leading sire for the National Reined Cow Horse Association (NRHCA). High earners in AQHA shows include Bald N Shiney, Shining Smokin Spark, and Shiners Diamond Jill.

He was also a broodmare sire. Foals from his daughters earned over $24.1 million. His highest money-earning progeny in the NRCHA is Smart Shinetta. She is a 2002 mare sired by Docs Hickory and out of Smart Hickory. She has $128,169.92 in the books. A granddaughter in reining, Shiners Chic has $315,876. Another granddaughter that was a top money earner and decorated bridle horse was CD Dee Vee Dee.

Awards 
Earnings top spot current $4,192,214.26
Progeny cow horse earnings $4,536,790
 1993 - AQHA Junior Reining World Championship
 1994 - NHRA Open Derby World Championship
 2002 - One Million Dollar Sire NRHA
 2003 - Two Million Dollar Sire NRHA
 2004 - One Million Dollar Sire NRCHA
 2006 - Two Million Dollar Sire NRCHA
 2008 - Three Million Dollar Sire NRHA
 2013 - Four Million Dollar Sire NRHA
 Three Million Dollar Sire NRCHA
 Four Million Dollar Sire NRCHA

Honors
 2013 National Reining Horse Association (NRHA) Four Million Dollar Sire.
 2011 National Reining Horse Association Hall of Fame
 National Reined Cow Horse Association (NRCHA) Four Million Dollar Sire

Death and legacy 
Shining Spark and Carol Rose were living in Gainesville, Florida, at the end of his life. Rose had Shining Spark euthanized when he was 33 years old on December 27, 2021. He had many illnesses caused by his old age.

He made his biggest mark by siring 1,316 registered American Quarter Horses from 26 crops. His progeny earned 37,546 AQHA points. They have also earned more than $10 million in performance earnings. Some top performers he sired are NRHA Open Futurity Champion Shining N Sassy with $259,262. Also, AQHA Superhorse Shine by the Bay with $178,699. And also world champion A Shiner Named Sioux with $161,891.

Pedigree

References

External links
 American Quarter Horse Association
 National Horse Reining Association
 National Horse Reining Association Hall of Fame
 National Reined Cow Horse Association
 National Reined Cow Horse Association Hall of Fame

1989 animal births
2021 animal deaths
American Quarter Horse show horses
Reining horses
American Quarter Horse sires
American Quarter Horse broodmares
Animal deaths by euthanasia